Philaster may refer to:

Philastrius (died 390s), bishop of Brescia in the fourth century
Philaster (play), play by Francis Beaumont and John Fletcher, published in 1620
Philaster (genus), a genus of ciliates in the family Philasteridae